The Congolese franc is the currency of the Democratic Republic of the Congo. It is subdivided into 100 centimes. However, centimes no longer have a practical value and are no longer used.
In April 2022, 2,000 francs was equivalent to US$1.

First franc, 1887–1967
Currency denominated in centimes and francs was first introduced in 1887 for use in the Congo Free State (1885-1908). After the Free State's annexation by Belgium, the currency continued in the Belgian Congo. The francs were equal in value to the Belgian franc. From 1916, the Congolese franc also circulated in Ruanda-Urundi (present day Rwanda and Burundi) and, from 1952, the currency was issued jointly in the names of the Belgian Congo and Ruanda-Urundi. After the independence of the Democratic Republic of the Congo in 1960, Ruanda-Urundi adopted its own franc, whilst, between 1960 and 1963, Katanga also issued a franc of its own.

The franc remained Congo's currency after independence until 1967, when the zaïre was introduced, at a rate of 1 zaïre = 1,000 francs.

Coins
In 1887, holed, copper coins were introduced in denominations of 1, 2, 5 and 10 centimes, together with silver coins worth 50 centimes, and 1, 2, and 5 francs. Coins ceased to be minted in silver in 1896. Holed, cupro-nickel 5, 10 and 20 centime coins were introduced in 1906, with the remaining copper coins (worth 1 and 2 centimes) minted until 1919. Cupro-nickel 50 centime and 1 franc coins were introduced in 1921 and 1920, respectively.

The coinage of Belgian Congo ceased in 1929, only to be resumed in 1936 and 1937 for the issue of nickel-bronze 5 franc coins. In 1943, hexagonal, brass 2 franc coins were introduced, followed by round, brass coins worth 1, 2 and 5 francs, and silver 50 franc coins, between 1944 and 1947.

In 1952, brass 5-franc coins were issued carrying the name "Ruanda-Urundi" for the first time.

Aluminum coins worth 50 centimes, 1 and 5 francs followed between 1954 and 1957. In 1965, the only franc-denominated coins of the first Democratic Republic of Congo were issued, aluminum coins worth 10 francs.
 
As with Belgium's own coins, some types were issued in two distinct versions, one with French legends, the other with Dutch legends.

Banknotes

In 1896 the Independent State of Congo issued 10 and 100 franc notes. In 1912, the Bank of Belgian Congo introduced 20 and 1000 francs, followed by notes of 1, 5 and 100 franc notes in 1914. The 1-franc notes were only printed until 1920, whilst 10 franc notes were introduced in 1937. 500 francs were introduced in the 1940s, with 10,000 francs introduced in 1942.

In 1952, the Central Bank of Belgian Congo and Ruanda-Urundi introduced notes for 5, 10, 20, 50 and 100 francs, with 500 and 1000 francs added in 1953.

In 1961, the National Bank of Congo introduced notes for 20, 50, 100, 500 and 1000 francs, some of which were issued until 1964. In 1962, the Monetary Council of the Republic of Congo introduced 1000 franc notes, which were notes of the Central Bank of Belgian Congo and Ruanda-Urundi overprinted with the Monetary Council's name. In 1963, the Monetary Council issued regular type 100 and 5000 franc notes.

Second franc, 1997–
The franc was re-established in 1997, replacing the new zaïre at a rate of 1 franc = 100,000 new zaïres. This was equivalent to 300 trillion old francs.

Coins
Coins were never issued as even fractional units of 1, 5, 10, 20 and 50 centimes were issued in banknote form only.

Banknotes
On 30 June 1998, banknotes were introduced in denominations of 1, 5, 10, 20 and 50 centimes, 1, 5, 10, 20, 50 and 100 francs, though all are dated 01.11.1997. 200-franc notes were introduced in 2000, followed by 500-franc notes in 2002. As of July 2018, the only negotiable instrument in circulation in the Democratic Republic of the Congo are banknotes of 10, 20, 50, 100, 200, 500, 1,000, 5,000, 10,000 and 20,000 francs. Meanwhile, merchants in Kinshasa were skeptical about the 5,000-franc note due either to counterfeiting of this denomination, or else an irregular or unauthorised issue of the genuine note, bearing the serial number suffix C. Although the banknote is accepted in most of the country, it is no longer in circulation in Kinshasa.

In 2010, Banque Centrale du Congo issued 20 million 500 franc banknotes to commemorate the country's 50th anniversary of independence from Belgium.

On July 2, 2012, the Banque Centrale du Congo issued new banknotes in denominations of 1,000, 5,000, 10,000 and 20,000 francs.

The smallest note in use is 50 francs.

See also
 Economy of the Democratic Republic of the Congo

References

External links

Zaire currency from country data.com
Histoire de la monnaie au Congo. Banque Centrale du Congo

Currencies of Africa
Currencies of the Democratic Republic of the Congo
1887 introductions
Currencies of Rwanda
Currencies of Burundi
1967 disestablishments
Currencies introduced in 1997